The Asian Cup was an ice hockey tournament featuring national teams from the continent of Asia from 1992–1995. It was organized by the International Ice Hockey Federation.

History
The first tournament was scheduled to be played in February 1991, but it was moved to January 1992 due to the Second Gulf War. Four teams participated in the tournament, held in Obihiro, with Japan winning by virtue of defeating China in the final. The same four teams participated in the 1993 tournament, held in Sapporo. It was again won by Japan, which finished the tournament undefeated. The tournament was not held in 1994, but resumed in 1995, this time being held in Seoul. Kazakhstan, which made their debut at this tournament, was victorious with a perfect 3–0 record.

Champions
1992 
1993 
1995

Medal table

Results

1992

First round

Final round
3rd place

Final

1993

1995

References

Ice hockey tournaments in Asia
Cup
Cup
Cup
1991
1995